Ørjan Hopen (born 19 March 1992) is a Norwegian footballer midfielder who currently plays for Funnefoss/Vormsund IL in the Norwegian fourth division.

Personal life
He is the son of former Sogndal player Arild Hopen.

Club career
He was brought up in the Sogndal system and signed his first professional contract in 2008. He scored his first competitive goal for Sogndal in his first competitive match against Smørås IL when he came on as a substitute in the 74th minute and scoring his goal at the 83rd minute mark in the First Round of the 2009 Norwegian Football Cup. He made his debut in Tippeligaen against Strømsgodset with another sub appearance in the first round of the 2011 season on 20 March 2011.

After a couple of years in second-tier Levanger he left ahead of the 2017 season. After three months as a free agent he signed for third-tier Skeid.

Career statistics 

Source:

References

1992 births
Living people
People from Sogndal
Norwegian footballers
Sogndal Fotball players
Nest-Sotra Fotball players
Bryne FK players
Norwegian First Division players
Eliteserien players
Skeid Fotball players
Association football midfielders
Sportspeople from Vestland